Barcino is a non-operational PKP railway station in Barcino (Pomeranian Voivodeship), Poland.

Lines crossing the station

References 
Barcino article at Polish Stations Database, URL accessed at 29 March 2006

External links
Barcino at Google Local
Barcino information at powiatslupsk.info

Railway stations in Pomeranian Voivodeship
Disused railway stations in Pomeranian Voivodeship
Słupsk County